Belding's ground squirrel (Urocitellus beldingi), also called pot gut, sage rat or picket-pin, is a squirrel that lives on mountains in the western United States. This species is not of conservation concern, and its range includes some protected areas.

Physical description
The Belding's ground squirrel is medium-sized with "a relatively short tail, short limbs, and small ears". It has a gray pelage become more cinnamon at the underside and reddish-brown on the back. The distal hairs of the tail have three color bands, one black, one white and one red. On average, the ground squirrel weighs . Its feet are covered in little to no hair. Compared to other ground squirrel species, its cheek pouches are moderate in size.

Ecology

Range and habitat
Being native to the northwestern United States, the Belding's ground squirrel ranges covers northeastern Oregon and part of Washington, north California, southwestern Idaho, north and central Nevada and northwestern Utah. The ground squirrel prefers to live at higher altitudes, occurring in alpine and subalpine meadows.  It is also found in sagebrush flats, brush/grass habitats and cultivated areas. The grounds squirrels are largely restricted to open areas with enough fresh vegetation and water. They do not live in dense forests, tall grasses, rocky slopes or thick shrubbery as they cannot watch for predators. In addition they do not prefer grass that is too short as they cannot hide from predators.

Food and feeding
Belding's ground squirrels have a largely herbivorous diet. However they will also eat insects, carrion, other vertebrates, and even other conspecifics. They mostly eat flowers and seeds.  They also eat nuts, grains, roots, bulbs, mushrooms and green vegetation. Belding's ground squirrels do not keep food in caches. Instead they store fat reserves. As such, the ground squirrels may eat a great amount of food before hibernation. They must spend as much as 40% of the summer eating. When eating, the ground squirrel feeds itself with its front paws while standing on its back paws.

Hibernation
Belding's ground squirrels hibernate at different times, depending on the sex and age of the individual and the altitude of their environment. Adult males go into hibernation between late July and early September when at higher altitudes.  Females may follow them in late September, depending on the elevation. Juveniles follow their parent into hibernation with juvenile females first going when they are 13 weeks old and males when they are 10 weeks old. They enter when the grass begins to dry and turn brown. This way they can avoid the hot, dry end of the summer.

The ground squirrels hibernate in burrow chambers called hibernacula. Males tend to hibernate alone while females tend to hibernate together. The time in which ground squirrel emerge from their hibernation also depends on different factors. At lower elevations, males emerge in February while at higher elevations, they emerge at the end of April. Female emergence is spread over several weeks.

Activities
Belding's ground squirrels leave their burrows at sunrise. The first squirrel to enter the surface will stay at the burrow entrance until there are enough following squirrels above ground to watch for predators. The squirrels then move farther from the burrows. Most activity occurs in the morning with digging and feeding. Squirrel activity tends to decrease when the temperature increases. Much of the day is spent stretched out on rocks or on the ground getting warmth from the sun. They will also maintain burrows and groom each other. When the young are above ground they will engage in play. The ground squirrels will go back into their burrows in the afternoon. Juveniles enter later than adults.

Behavior

Family relations
Belding's ground squirrels live in a nepotistic society where most interactions occur between females and their offspring and kin. It seems that cooperation between individuals correlates with their degree of relatedness. Ground squirrels recognize their kin by comparing their phenotypes with these of squirrels they encounter. These phenotypes come in the form of scent though dorsal and anal glands that leave a "pungent" odor in the dust bathing areas. Each squirrel has its own repertoire of scents that others can use to recognize it. If an individual's phenotype matches, it may be a relative. A female may also use her sister's phenotype as a basis for determining the relatedness of unfamiliar females.  Recognizing their relatives is important for female Belding's ground squirrels. This allows them to know whom to act nepotistic towards when defending nests or territories or when making alarm calls. Related females will also, at times, share food and shelter.   Adult males do not display nepotistic behavior and are nomadic between seasons. Although many ground squirrels live in colonies, there is little social interaction between them and it is mostly agonistic.

Alarm calls
Belding's ground squirrels are prey for various predators such as coyotes, bobcats, weasels, eagles and badgers. Ground squirrels will also perceive humans, livestock and cars as threats. Ground squirrels have two specific alarm calls used to warn others of predators.  One call, known as the churr call or the trill, is made of a series of more than five notes given rapidly. These calls are given for predators that pose less immediate threats, usually terrestrial predators. Individuals that are close to the alarm caller will respond by standing on their back legs (posting), running on a rock to get a better view of the predator or by returning to their core area.

Another alarm call is known as the whistle, which is a single high-pitched note. This call is made in response to immediate threats, usually aerial ones. All individuals in hearing range will exhibit evasive behavior such as crouching or fleeing into the nearest shelter. When running from aerial predators, squirrels call while escaping. By contrast, when running from terrestrial predators, escaping squirrels do not call until they make it to safety. In addition, with aerial predators, all squirrels will call while with terrestrial predators, only females with kin will call. The squirrel that first sounds the alarm posts while calling, looking at the predator and will not try to hide.

Reproduction and parenting
For Belding's ground squirrels mating occurs after hibernation, usually in late May to early June. The ground squirrels mate promiscuously, as both males and females mate with multiple partners.  Females are sexually receptive for less than five hours each year. Thus when a female is receptive, the males immediately gather around her. They will fight viciously to gain access, grappling, kicking, scratching, and biting each other. Larger, older, and stronger males are more likely to mate. A single female can mate with as many as five males during her estrous; this increases the chance of pregnancy, and also increases genetic diversity.

Females give birth to one litter a year. Pregnant females will dig nesting burrows and gather grass and grass roots to make nests. Nesting-only territories are established around these burrows. Females protect the burrows against intruding unrelated conspecifics by attacking and chasing them. Defense of the territories lasts until the young are weaned.  The gestation period of the ground squirrel lasts 23–31 days and young are born late June to early July in higher elevation regions, while in lower areas such as Central Oregon young are born in March and emerge from their dens en masse about mid-April when the first warm days of spring begin.  Litter sizes range from 3–8 young. Females do all the parenting for the young as males disperse directly after mating. In their first few weeks of life, the pups are raised underground in the nesting burrow. They first emerge from the burrows in July and early August, at least in higher elevations, and are weaned at 27 days old.  At first, the young stay near the entrance to the burrow but start to explore on their third day. Males disperse from their natal burrow after they are weaned and continue to disperse after they breed successfully. The male that mates the most moves farther away from the colony he mated in. Females rarely disperse from their natal burrows. Infanticide is known to occur in Belding's ground squirrels. An intruding squirrel will drag a squealing, squirming juvenile out of the nest burrow, and promptly kill it by biting its head. The killer will also sometimes eat the carcass. Adult females and yearling males are more often the killers. The perpetrators of infanticide do not reside in the same area as the victim. Females never kill their relatives and they will help their kin in protecting their young from infanticide.

Taxonomy
Belding's ground squirrel was first described by Clinton Hart Merriam in 1888, as Spermophilus beldingi. Three subspecies are now generally recognized:
U. b. beldingi (Merriam, 1888)
U. b. creber Hall, 1940
U. b. oregonus (Merriam, 1898)

References

 A Natural History of California, Allan A. Schoenherr, 1992, University of California Press.

External links 

Urocitellus
Ground Squirrel, Belding's
Ground Squirrel
Mammals described in 1888
Taxa named by Clinton Hart Merriam